Godwin (or Godwine; died after 1017) was a medieval Bishop of Lichfield.

Godwin was consecrated between 1002 and 1004 and died after 1017.

Citations

References

External links
 

11th-century English Roman Catholic bishops
Anglo-Saxon bishops of Lichfield
1017 deaths
Year of birth unknown